Corner Bakery Cafe (CBC Restaurant Corporation) is an American chain of cafes that specialize in pastries, breads, breakfast dishes, gourmet sandwiches, homemade soups, salads, and pasta.  Corner Bakery Cafe is considered to be a part of the fast casual market segment of the food service industry, offering a somewhat higher quality of food and atmosphere than a typical fast food restaurant, and offering limited table service.

History
Corner Bakery Cafe was founded by Lettuce Entertain You Enterprises, a Chicago-based restaurant group. It was sold to Brinker International, and then in 2005 to Il Fornaio (America) Corporation. Roark Capital Group bought Il Fornaio in 2011. In 2020, the Corner Bakery Cafe was purchased by Pandya Restaurant Growth Brands, LLC, a subsidiary of the Rohan Group of Companies. Mike Hislop is the chairman of the board. Mike came on as COO after the sale to CBC Restaurant Corporation.

Jim Vinz, the previous president & COO, had been with the company in various capacities since 1995, and was promoted to COO in 2005 and president in 2006.

The cafe has 192 locations nationwide, with large numbers in California, Texas, Pennsylvania and Illinois.

On February 23, 2023, Corner Bakery Cafe filed for Chapter 11 bankruptcy.

See also
 List of bakery cafés

References

External links
 Corner Bakery Cafe

Restaurants established in 1991
Bakery cafés
Restaurant chains in the United States
Companies formerly listed on the Nasdaq
Fast casual restaurants
Restaurant franchises
Restaurants in Dallas
Private equity portfolio companies
Bakeries of the United States
Companies that filed for Chapter 11 bankruptcy in 2023
1991 establishments in Illinois
American companies established in 1991
Coffeehouses and cafés in the United States